EBSF may refer to:
 Estonian Baseball and Softball Federation
 European Benchrest Shooting Federation, the European international member body of the World Benchrest Shooting Federation (WBSF)
 Exploring Ballet with Suzanne Farrell, at John F. Kennedy Center for the Performing Arts
 EBSF–1250 is a guitar model of the Gibson ES series